Anaesthetis flavipilis is a species of beetle in the family Cerambycidae. It was described by Baeckmann in 1903. It is known from Kazakhstan, Russia, Siberia, and China.

References

Desmiphorini
Beetles described in 1903